Bouchy-Saint-Genest is a commune of the Marne department in northeastern France.

Geography
The river Aubetin flows northwest through the southern part of the commune and forms part of its western border.

Population

See also
Communes of the Marne department

References

Communes of Marne (department)